Banks Lake is a  long reservoir in central Washington in the United States.

Part of the Columbia Basin Project, Banks Lake occupies the northern portion of the Grand Coulee, a formerly dry coulee near the Columbia River, formed by the Missoula Floods during the Pleistocene epoch. Grand Coulee Dam, built by the United States Bureau of Reclamation on the Columbia River created Franklin D. Roosevelt Lake, the reservoir on the river behind the dam. The surface of Lake Roosevelt is several hundred feet above the original Columbia River, making it easier to pump water  up and out of the river's canyon into the adjacent Grand Coulee. Two low earth-fill dams, Dry Falls Dam and North Dam, keep the water in the Grand Coulee, thus creating the reservoir named Banks Lake. It is named after Frank A. Banks, the construction supervisor at Grand Coulee Dam.

At the north end of Banks Lake the city of Grand Coulee and the town of Electric City are located. Steamboat Rock State Park is in the north-central portion. The town of Coulee City is at the south end of the lake. From the south end, the water stored in Banks Lake is distributed over a large region for irrigation of the Columbia Basin Project.

Satellite photo
In this summertime photo, the land appears in shades of beige, brown, and green. In contrast to the rugged, irregular contours of local peaks, cultivated land appears as a network of rectangles, some deep green, others beige or tan. Bright green dots reveal fields watered with center-pivot irrigation systems. The greatest concentration of agricultural fields occurs south of the dam. North of the reservoir, vegetated hills predominate. Flatter terrain not under cultivation appears gray-beige, likely resulting from sparse vegetation, especially in the northwest.

References

Columbia Basin Irrigation Project

External links
Historic American Engineering Record (HAER) documentation, filed under Grand Coulee, Grant County, WA:

Historic American Engineering Record in Washington (state)
Lakes of Douglas County, Washington
Lakes of Grant County, Washington
Protected areas of Douglas County, Washington
Protected areas of Grant County, Washington
Reservoirs in Washington (state)